Plagioneurus is a genus of long-legged flies in the family Dolichopodidae. It contains only one species, Plagioneurus univittatus, and is the only member of the subfamily Plagioneurinae. The range of P. univittatus spans from the Eastern United States south to South America.

In the adults, the thorax is a metallic green, with a strong black stripe in the center, and the abdomen is black with white pruinose posterior bands. The wings are hyaline.

References

Further reading

External links

 
 

Dolichopodidae genera
Plagioneurinae
Monotypic Brachycera genera
Diptera of North America
Diptera of South America
Taxa named by Hermann Loew